Qale Morghi Expressway is an expressway in southern Tehran. It is from Southern end of Navvab Expressway to Tondguyan Expressway. It runs from northeastern Qale Morghi Military Air Base.

Expressways in Tehran